Palera is a town and a nagar parishad in Tikamgarh district in the Indian state of Madhya Pradesh.

Geography
It has an average elevation of 246 metres (807 feet).

Demographics
 India census, Palera had a population of 14,646. Males constitute 53% of the population and females 47%. Palera has an average literacy rate of 52%, lower than the national average of 59.5%: male literacy is 62%, and female literacy is 41%. In Palera, 19% of the population is under 6 years of age.

External links
 पलेरा की वेब साइड

References

Cities and towns in Tikamgarh district